Daniel J. Barrett is a writer, software engineer, and musician. He is best known for his technology books.

Writing
Barrett has written a number of technical books on computer topics. The most well-known are Linux Pocket Guide and  SSH, The Secure Shell: The Definitive Guide. His books have been translated into Chinese, Czech, French, German, Hungarian, Italian, Japanese, Korean, Polish, Portuguese, Russian, and Spanish.

Corporate use of MediaWiki
Barrett, author of the book MediaWiki, has received media coverage for his deployment of MediaWiki in corporate environments.

Gentle Giant 
Barrett has been active in the resurgence of 1970s progressive rock band Gentle Giant from the 1990s onward. He created the official Gentle Giant Home Page in 1994, and though it began as a fan site, it was adopted by the band and is listed as the "Official Gentle Giant website" on the band's CD re-releases.

In 1996, Barrett compiled a 2-CD set of their songs for PolyGram entitled Edge of Twilight. Later, he also helped to coordinate the creation of the boxed sets Under Construction and Unburied Treasure.

Humor
In 1988, Barrett wrote and recorded the song "Find the Longest Path," a parody incorporating an NP-complete problem in computer science and the frustrations of graduate school. It has been played at mathematics conferences, incorporated into several YouTube videos by other people, and independently performed by a choral ensemble at ACM SIGCSE 2013. Computer scientist Robert Sedgewick ends his algorithms course on Coursera with this song.

Bibliography
 Barrett, Daniel J., Bandits on the Information Superhighway, 1996, .
 Barrett, Daniel J., NetResearch: Finding Information Online, 1997, .
 Barrett, Daniel J., Polylingual Systems: An Approach to Seamless Interoperability, Doctoral dissertation, University of Massachusetts Amherst, February 1998.
 Barrett, Daniel J., and Silverman, Richard E., SSH, The Secure Shell: The Definitive Guide, 2001, .
 Barrett, Daniel J., Silverman, Richard E., Byrnes, Robert A., Linux Security Cookbook, 2003, .
 Barrett, Daniel J., Linux Pocket Guide, 2004, .
 Barrett, Daniel J., Silverman, Richard E., Byrnes, Robert A., SSH, The Secure Shell: The Definitive Guide, Second Edition, 2005, .
 Barrett, Daniel J., MediaWiki, October 2008, .
 Barrett, Daniel J., Linux Pocket Guide, Second Edition, March 2012, .
 Barrett, Daniel J., Macintosh Terminal Pocket Guide, June 2012, .
 Barrett, Daniel J., Linux Pocket Guide, Third Edition, June 2016, .
Barrett, Daniel J., Efficient Linux at the Command Line, March 2022, .

Translations 

Bandits on the Information Superhighway:

 Barrett, Daniel J., Gauner Und Ganoven Im Internet, 1998, . (German)
 Barrett, Daniel J., Bandité na informační dálnici, 1999, . (Czech)

NetResearch: Finding Information Online:

 Barrett, Daniel J., 網路搜尋寶典, 1998, . (Simplified Chinese)

SSH, the Secure Shell: The Definitive Guide:

 Barrett, Daniel J., and Silverman, Richard E., SSH: Secure Shell - Ein umfassendes Handbuch, December 2001, . (German)
 Barrett, Daniel J., and Silverman, Richard E., SSH, le shell sécurisé: La référence, January 2002, . (French)
 Barrett, Daniel J., and Silverman, Richard E., SSH, KompletnÍ průvodce, April 2003, . (Czech)
 Barrett, Daniel J., Silverman, Richard E., Byrnes, Robert A., 実用SSH 第2版—セキュアシェル徹底活用ガイド, November 2006, . (Japanese)

Linux Security Cookbook:

 Barrett, Daniel J., Silverman, Richard E., Byrnes, Robert A., Linux Sicherheits-Kochbuch, October 2003, . (German)
 Barrett, Daniel J., Silverman, Richard E., Byrnes, Robert A., Linuxセキュリティ クックブック――システム防御のためのレシピ集, November 2003, . (Japanese)
 Barrett, Daniel J., Silverman, Richard E., Byrnes, Robert A., Linux Bezpieczenstwo Receptury, 2003, . (Polish)
 Barrett, Daniel J., Silverman, Richard E., Byrnes, Robert A., Linux Biztonsági Eljárások, 2004, . (Hungarian)

Linux Pocket Guide:

 Barrett, Daniel J., Linux - kurz & gut, September 2004, . (German)

 Barrett, Daniel J., Linux: основнЫе командЫ, 2005, . (Russian)
 Barrett, Daniel J., Linux: Guida pocket, May 2005, . (Italian)
 Barrett, Daniel J., Linuxハンドブック――機能引きコマンドガイド, August 2005, . (Japanese)
 Barrett, Daniel J., Linux: Kapresní přehled, 2006, . (Czech)
 Barrett, Daniel J., Linux - précis & concis, February 2006, . (French)
 Barrett, Daniel J., Linux - Guia de Bolso, July 2006, . (Portuguese)
 Barrett, Daniel J., Guia de Bolsillo - Linux, September 2012, . (Spanish)
 Barrett, Daniel J., Linux - kurz & gut (2. Auflage), September 2012, . (German)
 Barrett, Daniel J., Linux Leksykon Kieszonkowy, Wydanie II, 2013, . (Polish)
 Barrett, Daniel J., Linux口袋书(第2版), July 2014,  (Chinese)
 Barrett, Daniel J., Linux - kurz & gut, Die wichtigen Befehle (3. Auflage), February 2017, . (German)
 Barrett, Daniel J., Linux Leksykon Kieszonkowy, Wydanie III, 2017, . (Polish)
 Barrett, Daniel J., Linux命令速查手册(第3版), January 2018, . (Simplified Chinese)
 Barrett, Daniel J., 리눅스 핵심 레퍼런스, February 2018, . (Korean)

MediaWiki:

 Barrett, Daniel J., MediaWiki efficace: Installer, utiliser et administrer un wiki, March 2009, . (French)

Efficient Linux at the Command Line:

 Barrett, Daniel J., Linux Eficiente na Linha de Comando, September 2022, . (Portuguese)
 Barrett, Daniel J., Produktiv auf der Kommandozeile, November 2022, . (German)

References 

American computer programmers
American technology writers
American humorists
American rock musicians
Amiga people
Usenet people
1963 births
Living people